Five finger is a common name for several plants and may refer to:

 The genus Dasiphora
 The genus Potentilla
 Carambola
 Pseudopanax arboreus, a shrub native to New Zealand
 Tabebuia bahamensis